Anapodisma is a genus of spur-throated grasshoppers in the family Acrididae. There are at least four described species in Anapodisma, found in eastern Asia.

Species
These species belong to the genus Anapodisma:
 Anapodisma beybienkoi Rentz & Miller, 1971
 Anapodisma miramae Dovnar-Zapolskij, 1932
 Anapodisma qingyuan (Ren, Zhang & Cao, 1995)
 Anapodisma rufipennis (Zhang & Xia, 1990)

References

External links

 

Acrididae